Achthoven is the name of three villages in the Netherlands:

Achthoven, Leiderdorp, in the province of South Holland
Achthoven, Montfoort, in the province of Utrecht
Achthoven, Vijfheerenlanden, in the province of Utrecht